The flag is the symbol of the Subcarpathian Voivodeship, Poland.

Design 
The flag is a rectangle with the aspect ratio of height to width ratio of 5:8. In the centre of the flag is the coat of arms of the Subcarpathian Voivodeship.

The coat of arms is made of the Iberian style escutcheon that is divided vertically into two parts, that are of red and blue colour. On the left side, within the red part, is a silver (white) griffin with a golden (yellow) crown, beak, and claws. On the right, within the blue part, is a golden (yellow) Ruthenian lion with a red tongue. In the middle, in the upper part, above the creatures, is a silver (white) cross pattée with the edges of the arms concave throughout.

History 
The coat of arms was established as the symbol of the voivodeship on 28 August 2000.

References 

Subcarpathian Voivodeship
Podkarpackie Voivodeship
Subcarpathian Voivodeship
2000 establishments in Poland
Subcarpathian Voivodeship
Subcarpathian Voivodeship
Subcarpathian Voivodeship